The Eugene Generals are a USA Hockey-sanctioned Tier III junior ice hockey team. The team plays their home games at 2,700-seat the Rink Exchange in the Lane Events Center in Eugene, Oregon. The team announced it is on hiatus for the 2019–20 season.

History
The franchise joined the Northern Pacific Hockey League (originally called NorPac and later known as NPHL) in 2005 when the league was a Jr. B league, in 2007 the league and member teams were granted Tier III Jr. A status by USA Hockey, the governing body for ice hockey in the United States. In 2016, the NPHL was dissolved after two of the six members withdrew from the league. The four remaining teams, including the Generals, were then added to the USP3 Pacific Division of the United States Premier Hockey League.

After one season in the USPHL, the league reorganized its divisions when it added an unsanctioned higher league called the National Collegiate Development Conference, ultimately leading to the junior-level USPHL leagues to operate independently from USA Hockey sanctioning for 2017–18. The USP3 Division would be dissolved and the Generals were added to the Elite Division. During the off-season, the other three former NPHL teams left the USPHL, isolating the Generals geographically from the rest of the league. The Generals decided to remain in the USPHL, but would fill their schedule independently with nearby teams from academies and U18 Tier 1 AAA youth hockey organizations, only playing against other USPHL teams in showcases during the 2017–18 season. As Generals' general manager Flint Doungchak is also the USA Hockey Pacific District coach, the Generals were able to retain USA Hockey sanctioning for 2017–18 as an independent junior team. After the 2017–18 season, the Generals also left the USPHL to play an independent junior schedule. In their independent 2018–19 schedule, the Generals played against a mix of university club teams and Tier 1 youth teams.

In 2019, they announced they would take the 2019–20 season off to prepare to move up a level from their current Tier III designation by USA Hockey. The team did not specify what league, if any, they were planning on joining.

Season-by-season records

Regular season
Glossary: GP = Games played, W = Wins, L = Losses, OTL = Overtime Losses, SOL = Shootout Losses, PTS = Points, GF = Goals For, GA = Goals Against

Norpac/NPHL playoffs

USPHL playoffs
2017
Eugene Generals defeated the Seattle Ravens 2-games-to-none in Pacific Division USP3 Championship
Eliminated in USP3 Division Round Robin 1–2–0 (Lost, 1–3 vs. Charlotte Rush; Lost, 0–6 vs. Florida Jr. Blades; Won, 2–1 vs. Decatur Blaze)

Alumni
The Generals have had a number of alumni move on to collegiate programs and higher levels of junior ice hockey in the United States and Canada.

References

External links
 Generals website

Ice hockey teams in Oregon
Sports in Eugene, Oregon
Ice hockey clubs established in 2005
2005 establishments in Oregon